Fanagmore is a hamlet in Sutherland, Highland, in far northwestern Scotland. It lies on the south shore of Loch Laxford, an inlet of the Atlantic Ocean.  Fanagmore consists of three properties, a few farm buildings, a boat launch and a small harbour.  There are tourist cruises from the nearby hamlet of Tarbet to Handa Island.

References

External links
 TravelScotland, Loch Assynt area page

Populated places in Sutherland